Smite may refer to:

 A smite, otherwise known as a dueling scar

Geography
 Smite River, South Island, New Zealand
 River Smite, Leicestershire and Nottinghamshire, England
 Combe Fields, a parish in Warwickshire, England previously called Smite

Games
 Smite (video game), a multiplayer online battle arena video game

See also 
 HMS Smiter
 Verethragna, Zoroastrian divinity whose name literally means "smiting of resistance"